Bryostigma is a genus of lichen-forming fungi of uncertain familial placement in the order Arthoniales. The genus was circumscribed in 1979 by Josef Poelt and Peter Döbbeler, with the muscicolous lichen Bryostigma leucodontis  assigned as the type species. A dozen Arthonia species were transferred into the genus in 2020 following molecular phylogenetic analysis of the family Arthoniaceae that showed distinct phylogenetic lineages that were basal to that family. The genus contains several parasitic species that occur on hosts having chlorococcoid photobionts (i.e., green algae that have a spherical shape).

Species
Bryostigma apotheciorum 
Bryostigma biatoricola 
Bryostigma dokdoense 
Bryostigma epiphyscium 
Bryostigma lapidicola 
Bryostigma lobariellae 
Bryostigma molendoi 
Bryostigma muscigenum 
Bryostigma neglectulum 
Bryostigma parietinarium 
Bryostigma peltigerinum 
Bryostigma phaeophysciae 
Bryostigma stereocaulinum

References

Arthoniomycetes
Taxa described in 1979
Ascomycota genera
Lichen genera
Taxa named by Josef Poelt